The 2009–10 season is East Bengal Football Club's 3rd season in the I-League, and also marks the club's 90th season. East Bengal will seek to win their first league trophy for 5 seasons, competing in the I-League, the Federation Cup and the AFC Cup.

Squad
For the 2009–10 season.

[Captain]

Coach: Philippe De Ridder
Asst coach: Tushar Rakshit
Goalkeeper coach: Atanu Bhattacharya
Team doctor: Dr. S R Dasgupta
Team manager: Swapan Ball, Gopal Ghosh

Stadiums
Kingfisher East Bengal F.C. have been using both the Salt Lake Stadium and the East Bengal Ground sense Salt Lake Stadium opened in 1984. As of today the Salt Lake Stadium is used for East Bengal's I-League, AFC Cup, and Federation Cup games. The East Bengal Ground is used for the Calcutta Football League matches.

Pre Season tour of Myanmar
In 2009, under coach Subhash Bhowmick, East Bengal FC toured Myanmar in August for a set of friendlies as a part of their pre-season campaign after a heavy training camp in Puri, Odisha. The Red and Gold brigade had imported players like Jan Berger, Omar Sebastián Monesterolo and Ramez Dayoub, however, the latter could not be a part of the team since his previous club Safa SC denied transfer clearance.

East Bengal played 4 friendly games in Myanmar against Myanmar National League teams, in which they won 2, drew 1 and lost 1 before returning to Kolkata.

Matches

Competitions

Overall

Overview

IFA Shield

Group A

Fixtures & results

Durand Cup

Group D

Fixtures & results

Calcutta Football League

Fixtures & results

Federation Cup

Group A

Fixtures & results

E.K. Nayanar Gold Cup

Fixtures & results

I League

League table

Fixtures & results

AFC Cup

Group stage

Fixtures & results

Statistics

Appearances
Only for competitive fixtures.
Players with no appearances are not included in the list.

Goal Scorers

Sponsors
Main Sponsor: Kingfisher

References

East Bengal
East Bengal Club seasons